The 2012 Acrobatic Gymnastics World Championships was the 23rd edition of acrobatic gymnastics competition and were held in Lake Buena Vista, Florida, United States from April 16 to April 18, 2012. It was held at the ESPN Wide World of Sports Complex HP Field House.

Results

Men's pair

Women's pair

Mixed pair

Men's group

Women's group

Medal table

References

External links
2012 Acrobatic Gymnastics World Championships website

Acrobatic Gymnastics World Championships
Acrobatic Gymnastics World Championships
Acrobatic World 2012
Sports competitions in Orlando, Florida
2012 in sports in Florida
2012 in American sports
International sports competitions in Florida